Suntar may refer to:
Suntar (rural locality), a rural locality (a selo) in Suntarsky District of the Sakha Republic, Russia
Suntar Airport, an airport there